The Pride of the South is the name of the marching band at The University of Mississippi in Oxford, Mississippi. The full band plays at all Ole Miss home football games, and a smaller pep band is sent to most away games. The full band also travels to Ole Miss bowl games and Starkville, Mississippi when Mississippi State University hosts the Egg Bowl. The University of Mississippi Band has been giving outstanding performances in concert and in support of Ole Miss athletic events since it was organized in 1924. In addition to performing at all home football games and many away games, the marching band has attended numerous bowl games including the Sugar Bowl, the Gator Bowl, the Liberty Bowl, the Independence Bowl, the Peach Bowl, the Cotton Bowl, and more recently the Motor City Bowl in 1997, the Music City Bowl in 2000, the Independence Bowl in 1998, 1999 and 2002, the Cotton Bowl in 2004, 2009 and 2010, the Chick-fil-a Classic in 2014, the Peach Bowl in 2014, the Chick-fil-a Kick Off Game in 2021, and the Sugar Bowl in 2016 and 2022.

Ensembles
In addition to the Marching Band, there are four pep bands formed out of "The Pride of the South". These pep bands perform for numerous functions, such as the Walk of Champions, before each home game.

Another branch of the Ole Miss Band is the Ole Miss Basketball Band. The Basketball Band supports both Rebel Basketball teams at all home games after football season, as well as traveling to the SEC and NCAA tournaments annually. This group also performs at volleyball games throughout the year.

The Ole Miss Drumline also performs for Ole Miss Soccer Games.

During the spring semester, the Pride of the South splits into four concert bands: the wind ensemble, the symphonic band, the concert band, and the university band.

History 
By as early as 1924, the UM Band was a small organization under the leadership of a selected student Director. The band was participating in football games, home and away, by the 1926 season. The  Daily Mississippian reported that the group traveled by train to cheer on the team.      In 1928, Chancellor Alfred Hume appointed Roy Coats as the university's first Director of Bands with faculty status. Coats’ initial marching band used instruments, uniforms, and equipment donated by the National Guard. Not until 1934 did the Rebel Band own full-dress uniforms, purchased with funds solicited by the general student body.

The UM Rebel Band performed at the 1958 World Music Festival in Kerkrade, Holland; they won first place with distinction in concert and marching competitions. That same year, the Rebel Band was invited by Jules Farber, U.S. Representative of the World's Fair in Brussels, Belgium. The band traveled to Europe again in the summer of 1966 with the Concert Singers and selected theatre students. While on the Music Theatre Abroad program, they studied and performed at some of the world's leading cultural centers.

The Rebel Band has performed numerous times on Regional and National Television and has officially represented the University of Mississippi at Gubernatorial and Presidential Inaugurations. The university's Wind Ensemble has performed on tour throughout Mississippi and was the guest performer of the Mississippi Bandmaster Association Clinics in 1988, 2002 and 2010. The Ole Miss Wind Ensemble was invited to perform at the College Band Directors National Association Southern Regional Conference in 1988.

The Ole Miss Band comprises students from diverse courses of study such as Pre-Med, Criminal Justice, Engineering, Political Science, Journalism and countless others. The Pride of the South offers competitive scholarships for students of every major in the university, contingent upon funding.
In 2010 Ole Miss hosted the College Band Directors National Association Southern Regional Conference, where both the Wind Ensemble and Symphonic Bands performed.

Directors

School songs 

Grove Routine: Prior to every home game the Pride of the South gathers behind the grove stage and performs the grove routine. The grove routine includes Mr. Willson's Warm-Up/Hype Chorale, Rebel March (Forward Rebels), R-E-B-S, Rock and Roll (The Hey Song), The Battle Hymn of the Republic, and I Saw The Light.

Fight song ("The Rebel March") lyrics
Forward Rebels, march to fame, Hit that line, and win this game, We know that you'll fight it through, For your colors Red and Blue—Rah, Rah, Rah.
Rebels you're the Southland's pride, Take that ball and hit your stride, Don't stop ''til the victory's won, For your Ole Miss. Fight, fight for your Ole Miss.

Alma mater
Written by Mrs. A. W. Khale and her husband in 1925.

Way down south in Mississippi, There's a spot that ever calls
Where among the hills enfolded. Stand Old Alma Mater's Halls.
Where the trees lift high their branches, To the whisp’ring southern breeze.
There is Ole Miss calling, calling, To our hearts fond memories.
With united hearts we praise thee, All our loyalty is thine,
And we hail thee, Alma Mater, may thy light forever shine;
May it brighter grow and brighter, And with deep affection true,
Our thoughts shall ever cluster ‘round thee, Dear Old Red and Blue.
My thy fame throughout the nation, Through thy sons and daughters grow,
May thy name forever waken, In our hearts a tender glow,
May thy counsel and thy spirit, Ever keep us one in this,
That our own shall be thine honor, Now and ever dear Ole Miss.

References

Southeastern Conference marching bands
University of Mississippi
Musical groups from Mississippi
Musical groups established in 1928
1928 establishments in Mississippi